The 2010–11 Azerbaijan Premier League (known as the Unibank Premyer Liqası for sponsorship reasons) was the nineteenth season of the Premier League since its establishment in 1992. The fixtures were announced on 29 July 2010; the season began on 7 August 2010 and ended on 28 May 2011. Neftchi Baku were the eventual champions, winning their first Azerbaijani championship since 2005.

The league was competed over two stages. The first stage consisted of a regular home-and-away round-robin schedule for a total of 22 matches per team. The competition was then split in half, with the teams ranked first through sixth playing out the championship and the European spots while the bottom six teams having to avoid one of the two relegation places. In contrast to the previous season, each team transferred their full record from the first to the second stage.

Adidas provided their Jabulani match ball for the season.

Teams
Standard Sumgayit and Karvan were relegated to the Azerbaijan First Division after finishing 11th and 12th, respectively, at the end of last season. They were replaced by First Division champions Ganja and runners-up MOIK Baku.

Olimpik-Shuvalan Baku were renamed AZAL Baku prior to the start of the season.

Stadia and locations

Personnel and sponsoring

Managerial changes

First round

League table

Results

Second round
The league was split into two groups; however, each team retained its record from the first round.

Championship group
The top six teams of the first phase participate in this group, which will decide which team will win the championship. Additionally, teams in this group compete for one 2011–12 Champions League and two Europa League spots.

The winners will qualify for the Champions League Second qualifying round, with the runners-up and third place team earning a spot in the Europa League first qualifying round.

Table

Results

Relegation group

Table

Results

Season statistics

Top scorers

Hat-tricks

Scoring
 First goal of the season: Bachana Tskhadadze for Simurq against Ganja (7 August 2010)
 Fastest goal of the season: 1st minute, Bahodir Nasimov for Neftchi Baku against Simurq (21 August 2010)
 Latest goal of the season: 94 minutes, George Gulordava for FK Mughan against Simurq (12 March 2011)
 Largest winning margin: 5 goals
MOIK Baku 0–5 Ganja (2 October 2010)
AZAL 5–0 Inter Baku (16 October 2010)
 Highest scoring game: 8 goals
Neftchi Baku 6–2 Ganja (23 October 2010)
 Most goals scored in a match by a single team: 6 goals
Neftchi Baku 6–2 Ganja (23 October 2010)
 Most goals scored in a match by a losing team: 3 goals
Simurq 4–3 Ganja (19 May 2011)

Clean sheets
 Most clean sheets: 19
Neftchi Baku
Gabala
 Fewest clean sheets: 4
MOIK Baku

Discipline

 Most yellow cards (club): 77
FK Mughan
 Most yellow cards (player): 12
Zurab Dzamsashvili (Ganja)

 Most red cards (club): 6
Baku 
Ganja
 Most red cards (player): 2
Aziz Guliyev (Baku)
Ramal Huseynov (Ganja)

Monthly awards

References

Azerbaijan Premier League seasons
Azer
1